Yucheng is a county-level district of Ya'an, a prefecture-level city in Sichuan Province, China. The district contains the city centre of Ya'an as well as the surrounding countryside.

Administrative divisions
Yucheng is divided in four subdistricts, 12 towns, and 12 townships.

Subdistricts
The urban subdistricts that make up the city centre of Yucheng and thus Ya'an are Dongcheng, Xicheng, Hebei, and Qingjiang.

Towns
Caoba
Zhongli
Yaoqiao
Hejiang
Yanchang
Shangli
Daxing
Shaping
Yanqiao
Duiyan
Duoying
Bifengxia

Townships
Guanhua
Babu
Longxi
Kongping
Liba
Xianghua
Helong
Zhouhe
Nanjiao
Beijiao
Fengming
Wangyu

References

External links 

 

Districts of Sichuan
Ya'an